James Wilcox may refer to:

* James Wilcox (actor), American actor; see The Peacock Fan
 James Wilcox (novelist) (born 1949), American novelist and professor
 James A. Wilcox (born 1952), American economist and professor
 James D. Wilcox, American film editor and director
 J. Mark Wilcox (James Mark Wilcox; 1890–1956), U.S. Representative from Florida